Gucheng is county of Hengshui, Hebei province, China, bordering Dezhou City of Shandong to the east.

Administrative divisions
Towns:
Zhengjiakou, Xiazhuang, Qinghan, Gucheng, Wuguanzhai, Raoyangdian, Juntun, Jianguo, Xibantun

Townships:
Xinzhuang Township, Lilao Township, Fangzhuang Township, Sanlang Township

Climate

References

External links

County-level divisions of Hebei